An ax (or axe) is a tool or weapon.

AX, Ax, or ax may also refer to:

Arts and entertainment
 Ax (manga)
 Ax (wrestler)
 Larry "The Ax" Hennig, another wrestler
 Anime Expo, an anime convention
 Aximili-Esgarrouth-Isthill, a fictional Animorphs character
 Ax, Ernie Colón's Marvel graphic novel

Businesses
 Armani Exchange or AX, fashion line
 Trans States Airlines (IATA code AX)

Places
 Åland (ISO 3166-1 country code AX)
 Akrotiri and Dhekelia (FIPS 10-4 code AX)

Technology
 .ax, the Internet top-level domain of Åland
 Citroën AX, a French subcompact car
 AX register, a general-purpose 16-bit X86 register
 AX architecture, a Japanese computing initiative to allow PCs to handle Japanese text via special hardware
 Microsoft Dynamics AX, an enterprise resource planning tool
 IEEE 802.11ax, a standard for wireless local area networks, marketed as Wi-Fi 6.

People with the surname Ax

See also

 Axe (disambiguation)